Chalastra is a genus of moths in the family Geometridae first described by Francis Walker in 1862. The type species of this genus is Chalastra pellurgata.

Species
The species in this genus include:
Chalastra aristarcha (Meyrick, 1892)
Chalastra ochrea (Howes, 1911)
Chalastra pellurgata (Walker, 1862)

References

Ennominae